Suvorovo is a rural locality (a selo) in Prokhorovsky District, Belgorod Oblast, Russia. The population was 89 as of 2010. There is 1 street.

Geography 
Suvorovo is located 18 km northwest of Prokhorovka (the district's administrative centre) by road. Kartashyovka is the nearest rural locality.

References 

Rural localities in Prokhorovsky District